The Brotherly Leader and Guide of the Revolution of the Great Socialist People's Libyan Arab Jamahiriya was a title held by former Libyan leader Muammar Gaddafi, who claimed to be merely a symbolic figurehead of the country's official governance structure. However, critics have long described him as a demagogue, referring to his position as the de facto former political office, despite the Libyan state's denial of him holding any power.

History

After the coup d'état on 1 September 1969, in which King Idris I was deposed, Libya was governed by the Revolutionary Command Council (RCC) headed by Gaddafi. On 2 March 1977, after the adoption of the Declaration on the Establishment of the Authority of the People, the RCC was abolished and the supreme power passed into the hands of the General People's Congress. Gaddafi then became Secretary-General of the General People's Congress.

On 2 March 1979, Gaddafi renounced all public functions and was designated the "Leader" of the Libyan state and was accorded the honorifics "Guide of the First of September Great Revolution of the Socialist People's Libyan Arab Jamahiriya" or "Brotherly Leader and Guide of the Revolution" in government statements and the official press.

Although this title was officially used only from 1979, it is often applied for the whole period of Gaddafi's rule. Although Gaddafi had no official government function from 1979, it was understood that he exercised near-absolute control over the government and the country. His 42 years in power prior to the First Libyan Civil War in 2011 have made him the fifth longest-ruling non-royal national leader since 1900, as well as the longest-ruling Arab leader.

Although ousted from Tripoli at the end of August 2011, Gaddafi retained this de facto position as leader of the Pro-Gaddafi forces, until his defeat and killing by the Anti-Gaddafi forces in the Battle of Sirte on 20 October 2011.

Political system of Libya under Gaddafi

The Great Socialist People's Libyan Arab Jamahiriya was formally managed on the basis of political ideology set out in The Green Book. The ideology was based on the idea of direct democracy, and direct decision-making of all citizens on all political matters. Across the country there were the basic people's congresses, which were considered the original holders of sovereignty. These included the composition of its adult citizens both men and women. Of their managerial and executive bodies formed the municipal people's congresses and committees, and then the General People's Congress (legislative body) and the General People's Committee (executive body).

Gaddafi rejected the parliamentary representation of the people or by elected representatives, as the General People's Congress was seen as a coordinating body that brought together all the popular congresses and committees, and not elected members who made decisions on behalf of the people. All laws were approved by the basic people's congresses, and then finally adopted by the General People's Congress.

Succession proposals
One of Gaddafi's plans was passing of the country’s leadership on to his son, Saif al-Islam, and the plan’s potential ramifications; the second is the political line adopted by the latter, and the internal and external roles he has played. Saif al-Islam was portrayed as the leader of the reform movement in contrast with the "conservatives" represented by the regime’s old guard, in particular the Revolutionary Committees.

See also
 Paramount leader
 Supreme Leader (North Korean title)

References

History of Libya under Muammar Gaddafi
Muammar Gaddafi
Politics of Libya
Positions of authority
Titles of national or ethnic leadership
Titles held only by one person